Martin Andersen may refer to:
Martin Andersen (footballer) (born 1986), Danish footballer
Martin Adolf Andersen (1844–1927), Norwegian politician
Martin Andersen Nexø (1869–1954), Danish writer
Martin Erik Andersen (born 1964), Danish sculptor
Martin Hoel Andersen (born 1995), Norwegian footballer
Martin Masai Andersen (born 1972), Danish photographer, art director, designer and educator, based in London
Martin Stig Andersen (born 1973), Danish composer and sound designer
Florida State Road 528, also known as Martin Andersen Beachline Expressway

See also
Martin Anderson (disambiguation)
Martin Andersson (disambiguation)